Air chief marshal Sir Frederick William Bowhill,  (1 September 1880 – 12 March 1960) was a senior commander in the Royal Air Force before and during World War II.

RAF career
Bowhill started his career as a midshipman in the merchant navy in 1896. In 1912 he attended the Central Flying School and in 1914 he was given command of the seaplane carrier HMS Empress. He became Officer Commanding No. 8 Squadron of the Royal Naval Air Service in 1915 and Station Commander at RNAS Felixstowe in 1918. Later that year he commanded RNAS Killingholme.

After the war Bowhill was not to rest for long from operational service.  In 1920 he was the Chief of Staff to Group Captain Robert Gordon for the highly successful Somaliland campaign. He went on to be Officer Commanding the RAF Depot in Egypt in 1925, Senior Air Staff Officer at Headquarters RAF Iraq Command in 1928 and Director of Organisation and Staff Duties at the Air Ministry in 1929. In 1931 he was appointed Air Officer Commanding the Fighting Area of the Air Defence of Great Britain and in 1933 he became Air Member for Personnel.

He served in World War II initially as Air Officer Commanding-in-Chief at RAF Coastal Command, then as Air Officer Commanding RAF Ferry Command, in which capacity using his knowledge of the sea he properly identified the likely position of the German battleship Bismarck using a Catalina flying boat allowing it to be sunk. His last appointment was as Air Officer Commanding Transport Command in 1943 before retiring in 1945.

References

Notes

Bibliography

 Wynn, Humphrey. Forged in War: A History of Royal Air Force Transport Command, 1943–1967. London: Her Majesty's Stationery Office, 1996. .

|-

|-

|-

Royal Air Force air marshals of World War II
Royal Navy officers
Royal Naval Air Service aviators
1880 births
1960 deaths
Knights Grand Cross of the Order of the British Empire
Knights Commander of the Order of the Bath
Companions of the Order of St Michael and St George
Companions of the Distinguished Service Order
Fellows of the Royal Geographical Society
Recipients of the Order of St. Vladimir, 4th class
Knights Grand Cross of the Order of Orange-Nassau
Commanders of the Legion of Merit
Grand Crosses of the Order of Polonia Restituta
Military personnel of British India